Kyawkku (also known as Kyawkku Hsiwan or Kyakku) was a Shan state in the Myelat region of what is today Burma. Its capital was the village of Kyawkku (Myinkyado) which had 344 inhabitants in 1901.

History
Kyawkku was founded around 1600 CE. It was a tributary of Burma until 1887, when the Shan states submitted to British rule after the fall of the Konbaung dynasty. The state was merged with Poila in 1922.

Rulers 
The title of Kyawkku's rulers was Ngwegunhmu.
.... - ....                Nga San Bon
.... - ....                Nga San Mya
.... - 1783                Nga San Ma
1783 - 1820                Nga Kaw Tha 
1820 - 1821                Nga Thi Ri 
1821 - 1843                Nga Chit Win 
1844 - 1852                Nga Shwe Maung I (1st time) 
1852 - 1856                Nga Shwe Yit -Regent 
1856 - 1863                Nga Shwe Maung I (2nd time) 
1863 - 1865                Nga Yan Kon -Regent 
1865 - 1873                Nga San 
1873 - 1874                Nga Shwe Maung II -Regent 
1874 - 1876                Nga Tha U -Regent 
1876 - 1877                Nga Tun -Regent 
1877 - 1881                Nga Pai Su (Nga Pyan)
1881 - 1922?               Nga Thaing                         (b. 1873 - d. 1922?)

References

Shan States